The 2002–03 Czech 2. Liga was the tenth season of the 2. česká fotbalová liga, the second tier of the Czech football league.

League standings

Top goalscorers

See also
 2002–03 Czech First League
 2002–03 Czech Cup

References

Official website 

Czech 2. Liga seasons
Czech
2002–03 in Czech football